Tova Beck-Friedman is an American artist, sculptor, writer and filmmaker based in New York City. Her work has been exhibited in the United States, Australia, Israel, Europe, and Japan. Her work is in the collection of Grounds For Sculpture, Yeshiva University Museum, Newark Museum, Sculpture Garden, the Shoah Film Collection and the National Museum of Women in the Arts in Washington DC.

Early life and education 

Beck-Friedman holds a BA in Fine Arts from Purdue University and an MFA from Goddard College in Vermont. In 1982 she pursued a graduate student research studies at the Tama University of Art in Tokyo.

Career 
Beck-Friedman's work has been exhibited and shown at The International Artists' Museum for the 50th Venice Biennale, New Jersey State Museum, Monique Goldstrom Gallery, New York, Sculpture Biennale in Beersheba, Israel, The Newark Museum and Boleslawiec International Symposium, Poland. Her artwork has been installed and is part of Grounds For Sculpture, the Yeshiva University Museum, Newark Museum and Sculpture Garden.

Among her fellowships and awards are: Franconia Sculpture Park, MN; USA/ Jerom Artist Grant; Accessibility at Sumter, South Carolina; Boleslawiec International Symposium, Poland; Gulgong Symposium, Australia; Environmental Sculpture Symposium, MuJu, Korea; Skidmore College, Saratoga Springs, NY; The Center for Visual Arts, Be'er Sheva, Israel; New Jersey State Museum at Drew University; International Biennial in Beersheba, Israel.

Beck-Friedman's oeuvre ranges from sculpture to photographs to videos and documentaries. Her work is represented in major public collections, including the National Museum of Women in the Arts, Washington DC; Grounds For Sculpture, Hamilton, NJ, the Center for Jewish History, New York, NY, Newark Museum, NJ, New Jersey State Museum, Trenton, NJ, Yeshiva University Museum, New York, NY, Jersey City Museum, NJ, Cedarhurst Center for the Arts, Mt. Vernon, IL, and Český Krumlov Castle, Czech Republic.

In 2016, Beck-Friedman founded an online art portal called The Pythians, showcasing older women artists' work.

Notable works

Installations 
 "Excerpts of a Lost Forest: Homage to Ashera", at Grounds For Sculpture 
 "Memory Imprints", at the Yeshiva University Museum
 "Primordial Quintet", at the Newark Museum Sculpture Garden
 "Triple Stelae", at Gan Remez, Be'er Sheva, Israel
 "Contemplation Pit", Franconia Sculpture Park, Minnesota.
 "Drawing Down the Moon", Gulfong, NSW, Australia.
 "Chrysalis", an environmental site specific-sculpture', Sumter, SC
 "Shadow", Leigh Yawkey Woodson Art Museum, Wasau, WI

Exhibitions 
 2015, Puffin Cultural Center, Teaneck, NJ
 2005, Yeshiva University Museum, New York, NY 
 2005, The Jerusalem Cinematheque, Israel 
 2005, Maison de la culture Plateau Mont-Royal, Montreal, Canada
 2004, Clark Hall Gallery, Southeastern Louisiana University 
 2003, Photo-graphic Galley, New York, NY 
 2002, Monique Goldstrom Gallery, New York, NY 
 2001, Monique Goldstrom Gallery, New York, NY 
 2001, Phoenix Project Gallery, New York, NY 
 1999, Ben Shahn Gallery, William Paterson college, NJ 
 1998, The Mitchell Museum, Mt. Vernon, IL
 1998, Visual Arts Gallery, College of Morris, NJ 
 1997, Bergen Museum of Art, Paramus, NJ 
 1996, Lisa Parker Gallery, New York, NY 
 1996, New Jersey State Museum, Trenton, NJ 
 1993, Bill Bace Gallery, New York, NY 
 1992, Quietude Gallery, East Brunswick, NJ 
 1992, Schering-Plough Gallery, Madison, NJ
 1991, The Newark Museum, NJ 
 1991, Bill Bace Gallery, New York, NY 
 1990, Herzliya Museum, Israel 
 1990, Visual Arts School Gallery, Be'er Sheva, Israel
 1989, Michaelson & Orient Gallery, London, UK 
 1988, Amos Eno Gallery, New York, NY 
 1985, Amos Eno Gallery, New York, NY 
 1984, Gallery Q, Tokyo, JapanTokyo American Cultural Center, Japan

Filmography

Awards/recognition 
Puffin Foundation grant for Red Father Documentary (2014)
TGD9 Art Festival, Geneva, Switzerland, artist participant (2011)
2010 Athens, GA Jewish Film Festival Shorts Competition—2nd prize.
Winner, Reel 13, New York  
Southeastern Louisiana University, Hammond, LA (2004) / visiting artist in residence
TGD4 symposium; Tambacounda – Gèneve – Dakar, Senegal, artist participant
 Boleslawiec International Ceramic Symposium, Poland, artist participant (1996 & 2003)
Geumgang International Nature Art Biennale, Korea (2003)
Accessibility symposium – From the Outside In, Sumter, SC, artist participant (2003)
Mishkenot Ha'omanim, Hezeliya, Israel, artist residence (200)
Franconia Sculpture park, MN / Jerome Foundation Fellowship Program (1998)
International Biennial, Be'er Sheva, Israel, artist participant (1995 & 1997) 
Clay/Sculpt Gulgong Symposium, Australia, artist participant (1995)
Environmental Sculpture Symposium, MuJu, Korea, visiting artist (1994)
Skidmore College, Saratoga Springs, NY / visiting artist (1990)
The Center for Visual Arts, Be'er Sheva, Israel / visiting artist (1990)
New Jersey Museum of Archaeology, Drew University, NJ, artist in residence (1998)

Further reading

References

External links
 Official website

 Tova Beck-Friedman at the ArtCyclopedia
 Tova Beck-Friedman at the Biddington

Living people
Purdue University alumni
Tama Art University alumni
Goddard College alumni
American women painters
American women film editors
American film editors
American installation artists
American women installation artists
American women sculptors
American documentary film directors
Documentary film editors
American documentary film producers
Israeli emigrants to the United States
Film directors from New York City
Year of birth missing (living people)
Sculptors from New York (state)
Film producers from New York (state)
21st-century American women artists
American women documentary filmmakers
American contemporary painters